Utopia Banished is the fourth studio album by the British grindcore band Napalm Death. The album was released in 1992 by Earache Records. It is the first album featuring Danny Herrera on drums following the departure of Mick Harris.
Metal Hammer put it on the list of the 20 best metal album of 1992.

Release
A limited edition of this album included a 3" bonus CD; the vinyl release included a bonus 7" containing the same material.

The 2007 re-release came as part of Earache's Classic Metal series with The DVD as bonus disc.

In 2012, Earache Records released a remastered edition on limited edition coloured vinyl and CD digipak.

Single
The EP "The World Keeps Turning" was released in July 1992 on vinyl and CD and contains two non-album tracks, "A Means to an End" and "Insanity Excursion".

Writing

Samples
Napalm Death make use of samples in some songs on Utopia Banished. The tracks "Discordance" and "Awake (To a Life of Misery)" sample snippets from 1988 science fiction film They Live while the track "Contemptuous" takes a line from 1987 war film Full Metal Jacket.

Track listing

Personnel

Napalm Death
 Mark "Barney" Greenway – lead vocals
 Jesse Pintado – lead guitar
 Mitch Harris – rhythm guitar, backing vocals
 Shane Embury – bass
 Danny Herrera – drums

Technical personnel
 Colin Richardson – production, engineering
 Pete Coleman – co-engineering
 Matt Anker – photography
 Mid – cover art
 J. Barry – layout

Chart positions

References

Napalm Death albums
1992 albums
Earache Records albums